Arisia Rrab is a superheroine appearing in American comic books published by DC Comics, usually those featuring the Green Lantern Corps, an intergalactic police force of which she is a member. Arisia is a humanoid alien with golden-yellow skin, hair and eyes, and has pointed, elven ears.

Arisia is named after the planet Arisia in the Lensman novels by E.E. Smith. Along with Eddore of Tront, she was created by writer Mike W. Barr as a tip of the hat to the groundbreaking series in his Tales of the Green Lantern Corps miniseries in 1981. Her last name is "Barr" spelled backward (note that her last name was added later, not by creator Barr).

Publication history
Arisia Rrab first appeared in Tales of the Green Lantern Corps #1 and was created by Mike W. Barr, Len Wein, and Joe Staton. She is killed in Guy Gardner: Warrior #43 (June 1996). Writer Beau Smith stated that "DC wanted her dead. It was part of their deconstruction of the Green Lanterns at that time. My intent was to kill her and bring her back with powers that had no leaning to the GL Corps".

Fictional character biography

Green Lantern Corps
Arisia is originally from the planet Graxos IV. Her father, Fentara, served as the Green Lantern of Sector 2815. In Blackest Night: Tales of the Corps #3, it's revealed that (in a rare occurrence) all of the Green Lanterns preceding her father belong to their lineage as well. After her father meets his demise while serving the Corps, her uncle Blish is the next chosen to serve as the Lantern of her sector. Blish too eventually gives his life serving the Corps and Arisia is selected as his replacement on her next birthday, making her at least the fifth member of the family to serve as a Green Lantern. Originally, Arisia is depicted as assuming the role of Green Lantern while still a teenager.

Arisia first appears in Tales of the Green Lantern Corps #1 (May 1981) as part of a large group of Green Lanterns sent to thwart Krona and Nekron. She, Katma Tui, Salaak, Ch'p (who refers to her as the "big cutie"), and Kilowog all relocate to Earth after the Crisis on Infinite Earths. Once there, she adopts the secret identity of Cindy Simpson, and redesigns the uniforms of the team to better reflect their individual personalities. Arisia is first shown as having a huge crush on Hal Jordan, the Green Lantern of Sector 2814, who ultimately reciprocates her feelings. After being stationed on Earth with Jordan and confronted with their age difference she subconsciously uses her power ring to age herself so that she and Jordan can be together. Later, Arisia is among several Green Lanterns to lose their powers due to a disruption in the Main Battery on the planet Oa (the source from which the Green Lanterns draw their power). However, Arisia decides to remain on Earth with her boyfriend Hal and pursue a modeling career. Their relationship becomes strained as they adjust to the changes affecting the Corps, which eventually leads to them breaking up.

Powerless
After her break-up with Hal Jordan, Arisia begins developing her friendship with Kilowog. During one visit, an accidental blow to the head causes her to suffer from memory loss and triggers a return to her 13-year-old mentality. She seeks out the only person she believes can help her: Hal Jordan. She returns to Ferris Aircraft, desperate to find Jordan, and (following an attack by the New Guardian Floro) is reunited with him. After a short time, her memories slowly begin to return, yet she still is not ready for the responsibility of being a Green Lantern again. Though she initially offers to return to the Corps as Hal's back-up, like Guy Gardner and John Stewart, the idea is rejected.

Over time, her memories return completely, and she seeks Guy Gardner's help in finding the missing Kilowog. Arisia offers to go to Oa with Gardner and the Justice League Task Force, as her knowledge of Oa would be an asset to the group. Gardner turns her down due to her lack of powers being more hindrance than a help. After her rejection, Arisia returns armed to the teeth and demands to join them. On Oa, they discover the skeletal remains of Kilowog and are attacked by Hal Jordan. She survives the attack and, upon returning to Earth, begins working at Gardner's new bar: Warrior's. On opening day, Arisia learns of Hal Jordan's supposed death from Kyle Rayner, though it's not long before Jordan arrives himself, proving the rumor false. He changes Arisia back into her Green Lantern costume and offers to return things to the way they were. Arisia argues that things have changed and that he is not the man he once was, asking him to leave.

While working at Warrior's, Arisia befriends Buck Wargo and Desmond Farr (aka Tiger-Man). Joined later by Lead from the Metal Men and a time-lost Lady Blackhawk, they act as bouncers, battling various villains that attack the bar. At times they are assisted by the Justice League Society member Wildcat. Arisia demonstrates enhanced healing abilities.

Murdered
A mysterious woman with ties to the equally enigmatic organization known only as "the Quorum" tries to cast a spell over Guy Gardner and gain control of his actions. Due to Verona's aid, who has sworn to protect the Warrior, Guy escapes the grasp of his assailant. In the midst of the conflict, the resurrected Major Force arrives looking for Verona as well. Though unsuccessful, he is only too happy to dispense with any of Guy's allies whom he crosses paths with. Arisia, unprepared for an attack by Major Force, is suffocated to death despite attempts to defend herself. After Arisia's defeat, Major Force calls Guy Gardner out by delivering a picture of her. In the ensuing fight, Gardner kills him. At her funeral, Hal Jordan (again in his Parallax guise), appears beside Guy Gardner to give his final respects to the woman he had once loved. Before leaving, he creates a floating green hologram of Arisia above her body.

Resurrection and beyond
After regaining his Green Lantern status, Hal Jordan travels to the Manhunters' homeworld of Biot with Guy Gardner. There they discover dozens of missing Green Lanterns (including those Hal had left for dead during "Emerald Twilight") in suspended animation being kept as batteries to power the Cyborg Superman and the overhauled Manhunters. Hal wakes several of the Green Lanterns, but they attack him, believing he is still their enemy. He finds Arisia unconscious and cocooned in a cavern wall and frees her. The Cyborg Superman reveals that after Arisia was murdered by Major Force and buried, her species' natural healing abilities revived her underground. Henshaw sent his Manhunters to retrieve her and bring her to Biot. Fully restored, Arisia fights by Hal's side, helping him destroy the planet. Though a relationship between the two is never restored, they do share a kiss.

Arisia was shown fighting the Sinestro Corps off Oa along with Kilowog and many of the rookie members of the Corps. The Guardians place her in a supervisory position over Sodam Yat, the Green Lantern of Daxam, as he is predicted to be an important part of the Corps' survival. Arisia initially has difficulty in this role as Yat has a tendency of ignoring orders. Arisia, along with most of the Corps, participates in the universe-wide Sinestro Corps War, which includes several important battles on her former home: Earth.

Sodam Yat
Following the events of the 2007 "Sinestro Corps War" storyline, Arisia continues to partner with Sodam Yat, now the host of the Ion entity. They have been working to free Daxam from Mongul and his faction of the Sinestro Corps. They only succeed when Sodam sacrifices himself by entering Daxam's sun and turning it yellow. On her return to Oa, Arisia finds the planet overrun by Black Lanterns, with the reanimated corpses of her family among them.

After the 2011 "Blackest Night" storyline, Arisia visits the meeting hall where she berates the Guardians over Sodam's death, and the Guardians implicate Scar as being responsible. Arisia experiences a nightmare which leads her to believe Sodam may still be alive.

Prior to the 2010 "War of the Green Lanterns" storyline, Krona removes Sodam from Daxam's star to extract the Ion entity. Arisia convinces Guy to stop at Daxam to look for Yat as they are on a mission to discover what is draining the power of all the lantern corps. Yat has fallen down to Daxam. The still unconscious Sodam's body is carried away by two boys and hidden from the other Daxamites. Sodam awakens in a cavern, surrounded by many Daxamites who revere him for his sacrifice. They reveal to him that his father and the rest of Daxam society wish to find him and throw him back into the sun so they can get their powers back. Convinced that his survival was due to divine intervention, Sodam declares that, before Daxam can be cleansed of its xenophobia, the rest of the universe must be made a better place. He leads his followers on a journey to "make the Guardians pay for their sins". While on this pilgrimage, Sodam is ambushed by the telepathic warlord Zardor, who later makes him attack Guy Gardner by having him believe Guy is a Guardian. When Arisia and Kilowog manage to break Zardor's control over Sodam, he flees using Sodam as his personal body guard. Zardor's last words for the corps are: "Enjoy the war". While this is happening, Arisia, Guy Gardner and Kilowog to discover what the source of the energy stolen from the Lantern Corps. Arisia does not lay eyes on Yat but is told by Gardner that Yat is under Zardor's control.

Later, Jordan, John Stewart entrusts Arisia with a diplomatic mission to Lantern Jruk's homeworld in an effort to stop them from an alliance with the brutal, murderous Khund. This 'diplomacy', which is mostly honorable hand-to-hand combat by Jruk, is sabotaged by the Durlans, shape changers who have declared war on the Lanterns.

A group of Lanterns, including Arisia, work to rescue a mysterious being they know that had been tortured by their enemies the Durlans. After a long fight, they find the prisoner is Sodam Yat. Rrab volunteers to fight back when the actions of the 'New Gods' endangers all ring wielders.

Powers and abilities

As a Green Lantern, Arisia is capable of projecting energy-based constructions, flight, and utilizing various other abilities through her power ring which are only limited by her imagination and willpower.

Other versions
An alternate version of Arisia appears in Green Lantern: Earth One. She is the descendant of a long-dead Green Lantern also named Arisia, and the inheritor of her ancestor's Power Ring. She is the leader of a rebel group against the Manhunters hiding out on a distant world. Hal Jordan and Kilowog track her down seeking help in fighting off the Manhunters attacking Kilowog's homeworld, but she refuses. Arisia later responds to Jordan's distress call and participates in the recovery of the Central Power Battery, and leads the Lanterns in rescuing the slaves in the mines on Oa. Following the battle, she is elected the leader of the revitalised Green Lantern Corps.

In other media

Television
 Arisia Rrab makes a cameo appearance in the Superman: The Animated Series episode "In Brightest Day...".
 Arisia Rrab makes a cameo appearance in the Justice League Unlimited episode "The Return".
 Arisia Rrab makes non-speaking appearances in Batman: The Brave and the Bold.
 Arisia Rrab makes a cameo appearance in the Duck Dodgers episode "The Green Loontern".

Film

 Arisia Rrab appears in Green Lantern: First Flight, voiced by Kath Soucie.
 Arisia Rrab appears in Green Lantern: Emerald Knights, voiced by Elisabeth Moss. In the film, Arisia learns about the history of the Green Lantern Corps (specifically with regards to Avra, Kilowog, Laira, Mogo, and Abin Sur) as told by Hal Jordan and fellow Green Lanterns.
 Arisia Rrab makes a cameo appearance in Justice League Dark: Apokolips War.

Video games
 Arisia Rrab appears in Batman: The Brave and the Bold – The Videogame, voiced by Grey DeLisle.

References

External links
 Arisia in the DC Database

Characters created by Mike W. Barr
DC Comics aliens
DC Comics female superheroes
DC Comics characters with accelerated healing
DC Comics extraterrestrial superheroes
Comics characters introduced in 1981
Characters created by Len Wein
Green Lantern Corps officers